Batavia Kill may refer to the following creeks: 

 Batavia Kill (East Branch Delaware River tributary), in New York
 Batavia Kill (Schoharie Creek tributary), in New York